Suzhou Zhongnan Center is a  tall building under construction in Suzhou Industrial Park (SIP), Suzhou, Jiangsu, China. Original plans called  for a height of 729 metres (2,391.7 ft) but plans were scrapped in 2019 in compliance with China's ban on buildings taller than 500 metres (1,641 ft). The new tower was proposed in 2019 and construction started less than a year later with a planned completion date of 2025.

Original Design
The original building's design called for a height of 729 metres (2,391.7 ft) with a total of 137 floors. The tower was proposed in 2011 and began construction in 2014. The building was planned for office space, high-end residential suites and a hotel, all served by 93 elevators.

Constructions were halted in 2015. In 2019, the tower was cancelled and replaced with a 499-meter tower. The original tower would’ve been the second tallest building in the world if it were actually completed.

See also
 Gate to the East
 List of tallest buildings in China
 List of buildings with 100 floors or more

References

External links

Skyscrapers in Suzhou
Suzhou Industrial Park
Skyscraper office buildings in China
Residential skyscrapers in China
Skyscraper hotels in Suzhou